Sycozoa sigillinoides is a species of sea squirt in the family Holozoidae, first described by René Lesson in 1932.

Distribution
In Australia, It is found in the waters off Tasmania, and South Australia. Elsewhere it is found in Antarctic and sub-Antarctic waters. in subtidal waters

References

External links
Sycozoa sigillinoides Lesson, 1930: Occurrence data & images from GBIF

Tunicates
Taxa named by René Lesson